The women's heptathlon at the 2007 All-Africa Games was held on July 20–21.

Results

References
Results

Heptathlon